Charni may refer to:

Charni Road, a neighbourhood in Mumbai, India
Charni Road railway station
Charni Ekangamene (born 1994), Belgian football player
Olfa Charni, Tunisian pistol shooter